Lam Ching-Ying (birth name: Lam Gun-bo 林根寶; 27 December 1952 – 8 November 1997) was a Hong Kong stuntman, actor, film producer, action director and director. Upon his death in 1997 Lam had featured in over 132  films with multiple credits as a director and producer. With a career spanning 3 decades his most notable works include The Prodigal Son, The Big Boss and the Mr Vampire film series.

Filmography

Film

Television

See also
Cinema of Hong Kong
Lists of Hong Kong films

References

External links
 Lam Ching Ying - HKMDB

Male actor filmographies
Hong Kong filmographies